Zion Lutheran Church is an LCMS (Lutheran Church–Missouri Synod ) church in Crosstown, Missouri.

2006 F4 Tornado
On September 22, 2006, significant destruction and damage were caused by an F4 tornado.  Zion Lutheran Church suffered damage to its roof and windows.

Gallery

References

Lutheran Church–Missouri Synod churches
Churches in Perry County, Missouri
Crosstown, Missouri